Leptadrillia incarnata is a species of sea snail, a marine gastropod mollusc in the family Drilliidae.

Description
The length of the shell varies between 8.5 mm and 14 mm.

Distribution
This marine species occurs in the Gulf of Mexico off the Florida Keys and Louisiana.

References

 Fallon P.J. (2016). Taxonomic review of tropical western Atlantic shallow water Drilliidae (Mollusca: Gastropoda: Conoidea) including descriptions of 100 new species. Zootaxa. 4090(1): 1–363

External links
 

incarnata
Gastropods described in 2016